Brittany Hayes (born February 7, 1985) is an American water polo player. She was a member of the US water polo team that won a silver medal at the 2008 Beijing Olympics.

Hayes was born in Orange County, California, and attended Foothill High School in Tustin, California, then went on to the University of Southern California for her undergraduate degree and the University of California, Irvine, for her graduate degree. Hayes then went on to Loyola Law School in Los Angeles, California.

Hayes now works as a workers compensation attorney in Orange County, California.

Career
Hayes was a four-time CIF Champion while at Foothill High School earning CIF Co-Player of the Year in her senior season. Hayes was also Seaview League Most Valuable Player her Sophomore, Junior and Senior years.

In 2004, Hayes was named the NCAA Tournament Most Valuable Player after the University of Southern California won the NCAA Championship. Hayes also was named a Peter J. Cutino Finalist in 2004 and 2005.

In June 2009, Hayes was named to the USA water polo women's senior national team for the 2009 FINA World Championships in Rome, Italy. Hayes was also a member of the 2007 USA water polo women's senior national team to take Gold at the 2007 FINA World Championships in Melbroune, Australia.

See also
 List of Olympic medalists in water polo (women)
 List of world champions in women's water polo
 List of World Aquatics Championships medalists in water polo

References

External links
 
 USC player bio

1985 births
Living people
American female water polo players
Water polo players at the 2008 Summer Olympics
Olympic silver medalists for the United States in water polo
USC Trojans women's water polo players
University of California, Irvine alumni
Medalists at the 2008 Summer Olympics
World Aquatics Championships medalists in water polo
University of Southern California alumni